Commodore Khalid Mahmood Hussain (born 1927), HJ, best known as Commodore K.M. Hussain, is a 1-Star rank naval officer and a war veteran, who is known for his participation in Indo-Pakistani wars and conflicts. He is a recipient of the military award Sitara-e-Jurat, awarded him by Government of Pakistan in 1971.

Naval career

Hussain was born in Lahore, British Indian Empire, in 1927. He did his education from Lahore, and attended Islamia College where he did B.A. from there. In 1947, he joined Pakistan Navy as non-commissioned officer. In 1952, he gained the commissioned in the Surface Fleet Squadron of Pakistan Navy. In 1954, he became Lieutenant, and in 1957, he was promoted to Lieutenant-Commander in the Navy. In 1960, he was promoted to Commander in the Navy. He is distinguished for his role in Indo-Pakistani War of 1965, and participated in Operation Dwarka. Under the command of Commodore S.M. Anwar, Pakistan Navy's Flotilla shelled and heavily bombarded the Indian Port Dwarka.

For his valor, Government of Pakistan conferred him with Sitara-e-Jurat in 1971. In 1967, he was shifted in Administration branch of Pakistan Navy where he worked there as Staff officer. In 1969, he was made adjutant at the Pakistan Naval War College.

In 1971, Hussain was promoted to 1-Star rank in the Navy. He was sent to PNS Dhaka and work under Admiral Mohammad Shariff. However, he was re-called back to West Pakistan, and was made Commander North (COMNOR). By the time, he was promoted, Pakistan entered in War with India. As COMNOR, Commodore Hussain was shifted back to Karachi port where he commanded a small light cruiser against the Indian Navy.

After the 1971 war, he was awarded the Sitara-e-Jurat (Star of Courage) along with many officers. In 1972, he was shifted in Naval Headquarters (NHQ). He was made Chief of Staff of Navy Staff, a junior position which was made to provide assistance to Chief of Naval Staff.

He oversaw the revolutionary changes in Pakistan Navy's command and structure, and is credited to supervised the construction of PNS Zafar, a naval established in Islamabad. His 1-Star assignment included Chief of Staff and Commander Pakistan Fleet.

In 1977, Commodore Hussain retired from the Navy and received honorable discharge from the navy. After retiring from Navy, Hussain joined Karachi Port Trust and associated himself with private Merchant navy. He briefly speaks and advocate for naval and marine safety in many different seminar. As of today, Hussain lives in Islamabad where he lives a very quiet life.

References

People of the Indo-Pakistani War of 1971
1927 births
Living people
People from Islamabad
Pakistan Navy officers